Vavae Malepeai (born c. 1998 ) is an American football running back. Malepeai has played for the USC Trojans since 2017

College career 
Despite having his season shortened due to injury, he led the 2019 USC Trojans football team with 503 rushing yards in eight games.  His 2019 season was cut short by a knee injury. Malepeai later revealed that he had injured the knee in before the season began and played hurt, hoping he could fight through it.

Personal life 
A native of Hawaii, his three uncles, Silila, Tasi and Pulou Malepeai, all played college football for the Oregon Ducks.

References

Living people
1990s births
Year of birth uncertain
American football running backs
USC Trojans football players